The FlightTime Radio Show is an aviation radio program that originates in Jacksonville, Florida.  The program delivers tips and information on all aspects of aviation to pilots and non-pilots. Guests on the program have included aviation greats from WW-II to today's students, pilots, and astronauts (i.e.: Corky Fornof, Patty Wagstaff...).

History

In June 2006, the city of Jacksonville, Florida passed an ordinance making it illegal for citizens to work on any type of aircraft at their home. The law specifically targeted owners and builders of aircraft. Milford Shirley, President of EAA Chapter 193, and chapter members joined forces with members of EAA Chapter 1379 to challenge the ordinance. The efforts to repeal the discriminatory law were successful. In October 2007 the City Council voted unanimously to remove the law.

In a radio interview during the repeal process, it was suggested to Mr. Shirley that a talk radio program about the fun and joy of flying, covering all aspects of aviation would serve the community well.

On January 5, 2008, FlightTime Radio produced its first live broadcast from the studios of WBOB AM-1320.  During its time on the air, FlightTime Radio has changed its broadcast frequency to WBOB AM-1530 and is now on WBOB AM-600, FM-100.3, and FM-107.7  covering Northeast Florida.  The change has considerably increased the broadcast area of the program.  Since the first show, the program has aired "Live" every Saturday morning.  The programming is now available through many PodCast outlets such as iTunes, the FlightTime Radio Show PodCast site, and others.  The FlightTime Radio Show is also available 4 times each day, 7 days per week on the world's only 24-hour internet aviation radio station, Flight Line Radio.  The show is known for doing "Live" remote broadcasts in support of aviation events.  In early 2010, the show was invited to broadcast from the Smithsonian Steven F. Udvar-Hazy Center during the National Air and Space Museum's annual father's day "Become a Pilot" celebration and was invited back for a second year in 2011. The hosts from the Airplane Geeks podcast joined Milford and Charlie for that 2011 FlightTime Radio live broadcast, which was incorporated into Airplane Geeks Episode 152.

In 2010, FlightTime Radio introduced a new segment called Flying Down Under. Produced by Steve Visscher and Grant McHerron from the Plane Crazy Down Under podcast in Australia, the segment appears every two weeks and provides insight into the world of Aviation in Australia.

The FlightTime Radio Show was thought at the time to be the only "Live" over-the-air aviation broadcast in the world.  Show sponsors include the Piper Aircraft Company among others.

References

External links
 Official FlightTime Radio site
 Official FlightTime Radio facebook site
 Official Plane Crazy Down Under Site

2008 radio programme debuts
American talk radio programs
Aviation radio series